Shlomo Erell (20 November 1920 – 20 November 2018) was a Major General in the IDF, and the seventh Commander of the Israeli Navy.

Early life and family 
Erell was born in Poland in 1920 and was taken to Mandate Palestine by his parents in 1926. His family moved to Petah Tikva, but eventually settled in Tel Aviv. In his youth, he was member of the Betar youth movement.

Career 
With the outbreak of World War II, Erell joined the British merchant marine. In January 1941, his ship was sunk by a torpedo from a German U-boat. Erell was rescued and after recuperating, he returned to the navy. After the war he was discharged from the Navy at the rank of captain. With the outbreak of the 1948 Arab–Israeli War Shlomo Erell joined the Israeli Navy and he became the captain of the Israeli Naval vessel Palmach. The Palmach was credited with many operations in the Sinai and in Lebanon. 

After the war, Erell continued as an IDF officer. He held many posts including being the IDF military attaché in the Israeli embassy in Italy, and commander of the Israeli Navy's missile ships. In January 1966, Erell was promoted to the rank of Aluf (Major General) and became the Commander of the Israeli Navy. In 1968, he resigned from his posts as Commander of the Israeli Navy and he retired from the IDF.

After retiring, Erell received a master's degree in administration from Columbia University. In the 1970s, he became a member of the Likud party and from time to time he was brought in by Israeli leaders as an advisor of Naval issues.

Death and legacy 
Erell died on 20 November 2018, on his 98th birthday.

Published works
 Erell, Shlomo (2000), Diplomacy in the Depths of the Sea. Ma'ariv Publishing.

References

1920 births
2018 deaths
Polish emigrants to Mandatory Palestine
Israeli Navy generals
Columbia Business School alumni
Burials at Kiryat Shaul Cemetery
Military personnel from Łódź